Hermann Remmele (15 November 1880 – 7 March 1939) was a German communist politician of the SPD, USPD and KPD. During exile in Moscow he carried the code name Herzen.

Biography

Early years
Born in Ziegelhausen near Heidelberg, Hermann Remmele was the son of a miller, and brother of the later president of Baden, Adam Remmele. Remmele attended elementary school in Ludwigshafen and then trained as an iron turner. After a period as an itinerant labourer, he worked until the start of the First World War in 1914 in the profession for which he had trained.

In 1897, Remmele became a member of the SPD, as well as the German Metal Workers' Union. In the years 1901 to 1914 he was an honorary representative and board member of the union's Mannheim, Darmstadt and Offenbach am Main branches. Remmele also became involved in leading the association of young workers in Mannheim and attended the SPD's  in Berlin in 1907/08. At the same time, he wrote for several social democratic publications.

1914 to 1932
From 1914 Remmele served in the First World War. In 1917, he co-founded the USPD. During the November Revolution he was a member of the Workers' and Soldiers' Council in Mannheim, and in was one of the co-initiators of the Soviet Republic in Mannheim (1919). That same year he was USPD District Secretary for Baden and the Palatinate. He held the same position in Württemberg until the end of 1920.

Together with a faction of the party, Remmele joined the KPD in 1920, where he was a member of the Central Committee between 1920 to 1933, while being a member of the Reichstag during the same period, and briefly becoming KPD chairman in 1924. From 1923 to 1926 he assumed the editor position of the party mouthpiece, Die Rote Fahne. Remmele became Member of the Executive Committee of the Comintern (ECCI) from 1926 onwards.

From 1930 he was chairman of the Kampfbund gegen den Faschismus (de).

From 16 members of the committee of the Communist Party organ, in 1924 only Remmele and Ernst Thälmann were left in the Official in 1929.

Exile in Moscow

After he, along with Heinz Neumann, lost a factional war within the KPD, Remmele relinquished his position in the party's Secretariat of the Central Committee in October 1932. This was followed in November 1933 by his exclusion from the Central Committee of the Communist Party and the Politbüro, and forced to resign from his functions in the ECCI. He subsequently left Germany for Moscow.

Following the Nazi seizure of power, his German citizenship was revoked in March 1934.

Death
Remmele, his wife and son Helmut were arrested during the Great Purge. On 7 March 1939, Remmele was sentenced to death and shot the same day at Donskoy Cemetery in Moscow. A Soviet court rehabilitated him in 1988.

Personal life 
Remmele was married (Anna (1888-1947) and had two children, one of them Helmut Remmele (1910–1938).

Further reading

 Schröder, Wilhelm Heinz:: Sozialdemokratische Parlamentarier in den deutschen Reichs- und Landtagen 1867–1933. Biographien, Chronik und Wahldokumentation. Ein Handbuch. Düsseldorf, 1995. , p. 673.
 
 Remmele, Hermann. In: Weber, Hermann, Herbst, Andreas: Deutsche Kommunisten. Biographisches Handbuch 1918 bis 1945. 2., überarb. und stark erw. Auflage. Karl Dietz Verlag, Berlin 2008, .
 Münz-Koenen, Inge: Familie Remmele. In: Hedeler, Wladislaw, Münz-Koenen, Inge (Hg.): „Ich kam als Gast in euer Land gereist ...“ Deutsche Hitlergegner als Opfer des Stalinterrors. Familienschicksale 1933–1956. Lukas Verlag, Katalog zur Ausstellung, Berlin 2013, S. 89–103.

References 

1880 births
1939 deaths
Politicians from Heidelberg
German newspaper editors
Communist Party of Germany politicians
German Comintern people
Members of the Reichstag of the Weimar Republic
Refugees from Nazi Germany in the Soviet Union
Great Purge victims from Germany
German military personnel of World War I